In mathematical logic (a subtopic within the field of formal logic), two formulae are equisatisfiable if the first formula is satisfiable whenever the second is and vice versa; in other words, either both formulae are satisfiable or both are not. Equisatisfiable formulae may disagree, however, for a particular choice of variables. As a result, equisatisfiability is different  from logical equivalence, as two equivalent formulae always have the same models. Whereas within equisatisfiable formulae, only the primitive proposition the formula imposes is valued.

Equisatisfiability is generally used in the context of translating formulae, so that one can define a translation to be correct if the original and resulting formulae are equisatisfiable. Examples of translations involving this concept are Skolemization and some translations into conjunctive normal form.

Examples

References

Metalogic
Model theory
Concepts in logic